Thomas Jefferson High School is an American public secondary school located in Jefferson Hills, Pennsylvania. It is a part of the West Jefferson Hills School District which includes West Elizabeth, Jefferson Hills and Pleasant Hills. These communities have a combined population of 15,000.

History
 the school district is designing a new building for the school. It will be a red brick building modeled off of Monticello, with an initial estimated cost of $100 million.

Extracurricular activities
The high school offers a variety of clubs and activities. The Thomas Jefferson American football team won the WPIAL Class AAA Championships in 1980 at Pitt Stadium and in 2004, 2006, 2007, 2008, 2015, 2016, 2017, 2019 and 2020 at Heinz Field. In 2004, 2007, 2008 2019, and 2020 the team won the PIAA State Championship in Hershey.

The school newspaper is called the Statesman. The yearbook is titled the Monticello and the literary magazine is named the Spectrum and features fictional submissions written and submitted by actual students and teachers.

Thomas Jefferson's band consists of almost 200 instrumentalists: saxophones, flutes, trombones, trumpets, piccolos, clarinets, drumline, tubas, majorettes, and colorguard each year. The band is led by James Mirabella of Steubenville, Ohio, originally from West Virginia. The band was featured as the WPXI Band of the week in 1998. The band was also featured at the half time show of the Pittsburgh Steelers and Baltimore Ravens AFC divisional playoff in 2011.

The theater program is also highly lauded, winning Gene Kelly Awards in 2022.

Notable alumni 
Rich Costanzo, former professional soccer player, Pittsburgh Riverhounds
Dom DeCicco, former professional football player, Chicago Bears, Minnesota Vikings, and Tampa Bay Buccaneers
Mark Deklin, actor and fight coordinator
Robert F. Frazier, attorney and former Pennsylvania legislator
Baptiste "Bap" Manzini, former professional football player, Detroit Lions and Philadelphia Eagles
Katie May, model, social media personality, and businesswoman
Lucas Nix, former professional football player, Oakland Raiders
Birgir Mikaelsson, former professional basketball player from Iceland 
Tyler Reed, former professional football player, Chicago Bears
Guy Reschenthaler, U.S. Congressman
Chase Winovich, professional football player, Cleveland Browns
John Zeiler, former professional ice hockey player, Los Angeles Kings

Notes

External links
Thomas Jefferson Band Patrons Website
West Jefferson Hills School District Website
Thomas Jefferson HS Football Website
The Statesman Website

Educational institutions established in 1957
Schools in Allegheny County, Pennsylvania
Public high schools in Pennsylvania
Education in Pittsburgh area
1957 establishments in Pennsylvania